Iwerks Studio was an animation studio headed by animator Ub Iwerks.

Financing 
Iwerks was working for Walt Disney when he accepted a contract with Disney's former distributor, Pat Powers, to leave Disney and start an animation studio under his own name. The Iwerks Studio opened in 1930. Financial backers led by Pat Powers suspected that Iwerks was responsible for much of Disney's early success.

Newly hired animator Fred Kopietz recommended that Iwerks employ a friend from Chouinard Art School, Chuck Jones, who was hired and put to work as a cel washer.

Despite a contract with MGM to distribute the cartoons, the Iwerks Studio was never a major commercial success and failed to rival either Walt Disney Studio or Fleischer Studios. In 1936, backers withdrew financial support from the Iwerks Studio, and it folded soon after.

Characters 
Iwerks created the characters Flip the Frog, and later Willie Whopper. Several short films was made with both characters.

Flip the Frog 

The Flip the Frog series was the first series from the Iwerks Studio, produced 1930 to 1933.

As the series progressed, Flip became more of a down-and-out, Chaplin-esque character who always found himself in everyday conflicts surrounding the poverty-stricken atmosphere of the Great Depression. After the first two cartoons, the appearance of Flip the Frog gradually became less froglike.

Willie Whopper 

The Willie Whopper series was the second from the Iwerks Studio. 14 shorts were produced 1933 to 1934.

Willie is a young lad who tells of his many outlandish adventures, which are then depicted on-screen. His fantastic accounts are, in fact, outright lies or "whoppers". His stories are usually preceded by his memorable catchphrase, "Say, did I ever tell ya this one?" The character's first film was "The Air Race" (1933).

ComiColor cartoon series 

From 1933 to 1936, the studio release a series of shorts (independently distributed, not part of the MGM deal) in Cinecolor, named ComiColor cartoons, which mostly focused on fairy tales with no continuing character or star. They are now in the public domain.

Iwerks also experimented with stop-motion animation in combination with the multiplane camera. Multiplane animation was Iwerks most prestigious invention. It allowed for a three-dimensional look, separating layers of the background, resulting in a greater feeling of depth. He made a short called "The Toy Parade", which was never released in public. The 1934 animated short "The Headless Horseman" was the first time Iwerks used the technique.

Image gallery

References 

American animation studios
Mass media companies established in 1930
Mass media companies disestablished in 1936
American companies established in 1930
American companies disestablished in 1936